Marinilactibacillus piezotolerans is a Gram-positive, piezotolerant, non-spore-forming, rod-shaped and non-motile bacterium from the genus Marinilactibacillus which has been isolated from deep sub-seafloor sediments from Nankai Trough.

References

Lactobacillales
Bacteria described in 2005